Walt Faulkner (February 16, 1918 – April 22, 1956) was an American racing driver from Tell, Texas. He moved to Milledgeville, Georgia at the age of two-and-a-half, and to Lake Wales, Florida at the age of eight. He then moved to San Diego, California in 1936. Faulkner competed mainly in the National Championship and in stock car races. In 1950 Faulkner became the first rookie to win pole position at the Indianapolis 500. He died in 1956 after a qualifying crash at a USAC Stock Car event in Vallejo, California.

Earlier in his career, Faulkner raced motorcycles, then switched to midget cars, later driving for the Edelbrock dirt track racing team.  He had great success in midget car racing and was inducted into the National Midget Auto Racing Hall of Fame in 2007. Faulkner was also inducted into the West Coast Stock Car Hall of Fame in 2006.

World Championship career summary
The Indianapolis 500 was part of the FIA World Championship from 1950 through 1960. Drivers competing at Indy during those years were credited with World Championship points and participation. Walt Faulkner participated in 5 World Championship races. He started on the pole 1 time, and accumulated a total of 1 championship point.

Racing record

Complete AAA Championship Car results

Indy 500 results

* Shared drive with Chuck Stevenson
** Shared drive with Bill Homeier. Each driver scored 1 World Championship point

Complete Formula One World Championship results
(key) (Races in bold indicate pole position; races in italics indicate fastest lap)

References

1918 births
1956 deaths
Indianapolis 500 drivers
Indianapolis 500 polesitters
Racing drivers who died while racing
American racing drivers
Sports deaths in California
People from Childress County, Texas
People from Milledgeville, Georgia
People from Lake Wales, Florida
Racing drivers from Los Angeles
AAA Championship Car drivers
World Sportscar Championship drivers

Carrera Panamericana drivers